Marpesia furcula, the sunset daggerwing or glossy daggerwing, is a species of butterfly of the family Nymphalidae. It is found in Central and South America, from Nicaragua to Bolivia and Argentina. The habitat consists of evergreen rainforests at altitudes up to 1,400 meters.

There are two distinct forms, the orange form oechalia and the form iole which has an intense iridescent purple sheen overlaying the golden-orange basal area.

Subspecies
Marpesia furcula furcula (Jamaica)
Marpesia furcula oechalia (Westwood, 1850) (Ecuador, Peru, Bolivia, Brazil: Amazonas, Argentina)
Marpesia furcula violetta (Hall, 1929) (western Ecuador)

References

Cyrestinae
Butterflies described in 1793
Fauna of Brazil
Nymphalidae of South America